The 107th Cavalry Regiment, Ohio Army National Guard, is a parent regiment under the U.S. Army Regimental System, with headquarters at Hamilton, Ohio. It currently consists of the 2nd Squadron, 107th Cavalry Regiment, part of the 37th Infantry Brigade Combat Team (BUCKEYE), Ohio National Guard located throughout southwest Ohio.

Elements of the regiment were involved in the Kent State shootings during the Vietnam War.

History

19th century
The 1st Cleveland Troop organized on 28 April 1886 at Cleveland. It was redesignated in 1895 as Troop A (1st Cleveland Troop) before being expanded, reorganized, and redesignated on 3 May 1898 as Troops A, B, C, 1st Ohio Volunteer Cavalry; the remainder of regiment being organized from new and existing units. The 1st Ohio Volunteer Cavalry mustered into federal service 9–11 May 1898 at Camp Bushnell, Ohio; mustered out of federal service 22–24 October 1898 at Cleveland. The former Troop A (1st Cleveland Troop) reorganized on 14 April 1899 in the Ohio National Guard at Cleveland; Troop B reorganized on 12 December 1902 in the Ohio National Guard at Columbus.

Early 20th century
The unit reorganized on 25 July 1910 as the 1st Cavalry Squadron with headquarters at Cleveland (Troops C and D organized in 1911 at Cincinnati and Toledo, respectively). It was mustered into federal service on 6 July 1916 at Columbus and mustered out on 28 February 1917 at Fort Benjamin Harrison, IN.

It expanded on 16 April 1917 as the 1st Cavalry. It was again expanded, converted, and redesignated on 23 May 1917 as the 2nd and 3rd Field Artillery then mustered into federal service on 15 July 1917 at Cleveland and Youngstown, respectively and drafted into federal service on 5 August 1917. The unit was reorganized and redesignated on 15 September 1917 as the 135th and the 136th Field Artillery, respectively, and assigned to the 37th Division before being demobilized on 10 April 1919 at Camp Sherman, Ohio.

The unit was then again converted, reorganized, and federally recognized between 20 October 1919 – 18 November 1920 in the Ohio National Guard as the 1st Ohio Cavalry with headquarters at Cincinnati. It was later redesignated on 1 July 1921 as the 107th Cavalry, an element of the 22nd Cavalry Division, relocating its headquarters on 10 May 1927 to Cleveland.

World War II
The 1st Ohio Cavalry consolidated on 1 November 1940 with the 22nd Reconnaissance Squadron (organized and federally recognized 15 September 1939 with headquarters at Cincinnati) and the consolidated unit was designated as the 107th Cavalry Regiment (United States); it was concurrently relieved from assignment to the 22nd Cavalry Division and was inducted into federal service on 5 March 1941 at its home stations in Ohio.

The regiment was broken up on 1 January 1944 and its elements reorganized and redesignated as follows:

Headquarters and Headquarters Troop as Headquarters and Headquarters Troop, 107th Cavalry Group, Mechanized.

2nd Squadron as the 107th Cavalry Reconnaissance Squadron, Mechanized.

1st Squadron as the 22nd Cavalry Reconnaissance Squadron, Mechanized (hereafter separate lineage).

After 1 January 1944, the above units underwent changes as follows:

Post war
Headquarters and Headquarters Troop, 107th Cavalry Group, Mechanized, inactivated 6 March 1945 at Camp Polk, LA;
107th Cavalry Reconnaissance Squadron, Mechanized, inactivated 16 November 1945 at Camp Bowie, TX. The regiment was reorganized and federally recognized on 10 November 1947 as the 107th Mechanized Cavalry Reconnaissance Squadron with headquarters at Cleveland. Headquarters and Headquarters Troop, 107th Cavalry Group, and 107th Mechanized Cavalry Reconnaissance Squadron consolidated on 15 September 1949 with the 185th Tank Battalion (organized and federally recognized 12 December 1946 – 30 March 1949 with headquarters at Cincinnati) and the consolidated unit designated as the 107th Armored Cavalry at Cleveland (The 1st Squadron was allotted on 31 May 1977 to the West Virginia Army National Guard).

The 1970 riot at Kent State University resulted in the calling out of Troop G of the 2nd Squadron 107th Armored Cavalry, along with Companies A and C, 1-145th Infantry, Ohio Army National Guard (ARNG).  Troop G was one of the units on the campus grounds, attempting to disperse the agitators and students after the burning of the ROTC (Reserve Officers' Training Corps) building.  On 4 May 70, four Students were killed when the Guardsmen from Troop G fired to suppress the rioting crowd.  A following court investigation found the Troop G Guardsmen guiltless of any wrongdoing.

The 107th Armored Cavalry Regimental Headquarters were located on Green Road in Warrensville Township, Ohio.  1st Squadron 107th Armored Cavalry Regiment served in Cleveland, Ohio for police actions and riot control in 1966 and 1968.  The Squadron was also called up for police actions in February 1975 when the independent truckers staged a strike over fuel prices.  The 1st Squadron 107th Armored Cavalry Regiment was put on alert in October 1973 during the Arab/Israeli conflict.  If activated the mission would have been to assume border patrols in Germany with Czechoslovakia to free up the 3rd Armored Cavalry to move to the Mid-East.
From 1966 through 1977, 1st Squadron of the 107th Armored Cavalry Regiment consisted of: Squadron headquarters (HHT) and A Troop located in Ashtabula, Ohio.
B Troop in Painesville, Ohio.
C Troop in Chagrin Falls, Ohio. 
Company D (Tanks) and How Battery in Stow, Ohio.

The regiment was reorganized and federally recognized on 10 November 1947 as the 107th Mechanized Cavalry Reconnaissance Squadron with headquarters at Cleveland. Headquarters and Headquarters Troop, 107th Cavalry Group, and 107th Mechanized Cavalry Reconnaissance Squadron consolidated on 15 September 1949 with the 185th Tank Battalion (organized and federally recognized 12 December 1946 – 30 March 1949 with headquarters at Cincinnati) and the consolidated unit designated as the 107th Armored Cavalry at Cleveland (The 3rd Squadron was allotted on 1 May 1968 to the West Virginia Army National Guard as 1st Squadron 150th Armored Cavalry).

The regiment (minus 1st Squadron) reorganized on 1 May 1977 in the Ohio Army National Guard (Troop A, Support Squadron, was allotted on 1 October 1986 to the West Virginia Army National Guard and re-allotted on 15 October 1990 to the Ohio Army National Guard). It was placed on 1 June 1989 under the United States Army Regimental System consisting of the following units:

Headquarters and Headquarters Troop 107th ACR – Cleveland, OH;

1st Squadron 150th Cavalry Regiment – Bluefield, WV;

2nd Squadron 107th ACR – Akron, OH;

3rd Squadron 107th ACR – Stow, OH;

4th Squadron 107th ACR – Greensburg, OH;

Regimental Support Squadron – Medina, OH.

Post 1990
The 107th ACR was reorganized and redesignated on 1 September 1993 as the 1st Battalion 107th Cavalry Regiment, headquarters in Stow, Ohio (formerly the 3/107th ACR) and assigned to the 28th Infantry Division. The 2nd Squadron, 107th Cavalry, was assigned to the 37th Armor Brigade. On 1 September 1994 the 1st Battalion 107th Cavalry and the 2nd Squadron 107th Cavalry, were realigned and assigned to the 37th Armor Brigade, 38th Infantry Division.

In September 2001, the 1st Battalion 107th Cavalry Regiment, was transferred from the 37th Brigade, 38th Infantry Division ("Cyclone") (Indiana Army National Guard) to the 2nd Brigade, 28th Infantry Division ("Keystone") (Pennsylvania Army National Guard) with its headquarters remaining in Stow, Ohio.

Iraq
In October 2003, B and C Companies, and elements of Headquarters and Headquarters Company (HHC) and Company A, of the 1st Battalion, 107th Cavalry were activated at their home stations and traveled to Fort Bragg, North Carolina, and Fort Stewart, Georgia, for five months of mobilization training. There they were then attached to the 1st Battalion, 150th Armor (West Virginia Army National Guard), the 1st Battalion, 252nd Armor (North Carolina Army National Guard), and Troop E, 196th Cavalry (North Carolina Army National Guard) respectively, for deployment to Operation Iraqi Freedom II with North Carolina's 30th Brigade Combat Team under the 1st Infantry Division. These elements of the 1st Battalion operated in Iraq from February to December 2004, serving in Kirkush, Tuz Khurmatu, Jalawla, and Baghdad. They participated in the Transition of Iraq and Iraqi Governance campaigns and returned home in late December 2004.

The battalion commander LTC Richard T. Curry and CSM Albert Whatmough along with the remaining companies continued their regular training cycle until October 2004, when the remaining companies of the 1–107th Cavalry were activated for service in Operation Iraqi Freedom III. One element of HHC 1–107th Cavalry was then deployed to Fort Dix, New Jersey for mobilization training and left for Kuwait in January 2005. The companies operated in Baghdad, Iraq and performed detainee operations at Camps Cropper and Victory.

The headquarters was deployed to Fort McCoy, Wisconsin and arrived in Kuwait in December 2004 and deployed to Mosul, Iraq in late December. This element included LTC Richard T. Curry the 1st Battalion 107th Cavalry Regiment Commander and CSM Albert Whatmough who both deployed with the battalion in 2004–2005 with the mission of establishing the Forward Operating Base (FOB) Endurance which later became known as FOB Q-West Base Complex 30 Kilometers south of Mosul, Iraq. The mission of LTC Curry and his staff were to provide command & control of the base, establish the Base Defense Operations Center, provide life support functions, establish base defense security, combat patrols and build the FOB from the ground up into the largest logistical hub operating in northern Iraq by the end of 2005, a mission that was accomplished prior to their departure.

The FOB Endurance/Q-West Base Complex HQ elements of the 1–107th Cavalry were attached to the 11th Armored Cavalry Regiment and received the Army Meritorious Unit Commendation (MUC) for their accomplishments. The HHC/A Convoy Security Company conducted operations throughout Iraq logging in thousands of miles with no fatalities and provided excellent security for convoy elements. Elements of the 1st Battalion, 107th Cavalry served within the 1st Cavalry Division, 4th Infantry Division, and 3rd Infantry Division areas of operations as units of the 18th and 42nd MP Brigades. The final elements returned home from Iraq in January 2006 reuniting the battalion. Both HHC/A detachments received the U.S. Army Meritorious Unit Commendation for their service.

Kosovo
The 2–107th Cavalry conducted peacekeeping operations in Kosovo under the Command of LTC John C. Harris in 2004–2005. The squadron was assigned as part of Task Force Falcon commanded by Brigadier General Tod J. Carmony (Deputy Commander 38th IN Division) and Deputy Commander (Maneuver) COL Jack E. Lee (37th Armor Brigade Commander), assigned an area of operations at Camp Bondsteel. The 2–107th Cavalry mobilized all of its units and 350 soldiers to support the deployment. A total of 1,000 Ohio Army National Guard soldiers mobilized in June 2004 for four months of training prior to a six-month deployment to Kosovo as peacekeepers. The soldiers first trained at Camp Atterbury, IN., followed by more training in Germany. The soldiers arrived in Kosovo in September 2004 beginning their mission. In late February 2005 the Ohio Army National Guard welcomed home the 2nd Squadron 107th Cavalry Regiment after successfully completing the NATO peace keeping mission in Kosovo.

Reorganization
As the U.S. Army conducted its largest reorganization since the Second World War, the 1st Battalion 107th Cavalry Regiment, along with D Company from the 1st Battalion, 148th Infantry, as well as a company from the 112th Engineer Battalion, were chosen to form a new combined arms battalion within the 37th Brigade Combat Team, 38th Infantry Division. A change in designation was required and the unit uncased the new colors of the 1st Battalion, 145th Armored Regiment, effective 1 September 2007. With the 1st Battalion 107th Cavalry Regiment redesignated as such, the only currently remaining element of the 107th Cavalry Regiment is the 2nd Squadron with headquarters at Cincinnati, Ohio.

Heraldry

Coat of arms
 Shield: Or, on a bend Gules between a Roman Sword in sheath point to base and a prickly pear cactus both Vert, three alerions of the field.
 Crest: That for the regiments and separate battalions of the Ohio Army National Guard: From a wreath Or and Gules, a sheaf of seventeen arrows Argent bound by a sprig of buckeye (aesculus glabra) fructed Proper (two leaves bursting burr).
 Motto: FACERE NON DICERE(To Act, Not To Speak)

The shield is yellow for cavalry. The bend charged with the alerions, taken from the arms of Lorraine, is representative of World War I service and is red to indicate that the 107th Cavalry served as Field Artillery during World War I. The Roman Sword in sheath is for Spanish–American War service and the cactus for Mexican Border duty. The motto translates to "To Act, Not To Speak."

The coat of arms was originally approved for the 107th Cavalry Regiment, Ohio National Guard on 8 March 1927. It was amended to correct the wording of the blazon of the shield on 17 June 1927. It was redesignated for the 107th Armored Cavalry Regiment, Ohio National Guard on 15 January 1952. The insignia was amended to add the crest of the State of West Virginia on 22 March 1971. It was amended to delete the crest of the State of West Virginia on 3 April 1975. The coat of arms was redesignated effective 1 September 1993, for the 107th Cavalry Regiment.

Leaders

Regimental commanders
 COL P. Lincoln Mitchell, 1921–1924
 COL Willard O. Lathrop, 1924–1926
 COL Dudley J. Hard, 1926
 COL Joseph J. Johnston, 1927
 COL Newell C. Bolton, 1927–1936
 COL Woods King, 1936–1943 (World War II, CONUS Service)
 COL Ralph King, 1943–1945 (World War II, European Theater)
 COL Walter J. Easton, 1947–1955
 COL Charles D. Marsh, 1955–1960
 COL Edmund G. Nowich, 1960–1962
 COL Ben F. Ritenour, 1962–1963
 COL George F. Huxel, 1963–1965
 COL Robert H. Canterburry, 1965–1967
 COL Dana L. Stewart, 1967–1971
 COL James A. Hill, 1971–1974
 COL Raymond R. Galloway, 1974–1977
 COL Arthur E. Wallach, 1977–1980
 COL Richard J. Lander, 1980–1983
 COL John E. Martin, 1983–1986
 COL J. Steve Martin, 1986–1991
 COL Mark V. Ryan, 1991–1993

Commanders 1–107th Cavalry
 LTC Kenneth R. Warner, 1993–1996
 LTC Phillip Richardson, 1996–1999
 LTC Donald Barbee, 1999–2000
 LTC James E. Perry, 2000–2003
 LTC Richard T. Curry, 2003–2006 (Operation Iraqi Freedom)
 LTC Jeffery J. Ziol, 2006–2007

Commanders 2–107th Cavalry
 LTC Larry M. Hott, 1994–1996
 LTC Michael P. Emerine, 1996–1999
 LTC Robert A. Recchluti, 1999–2001
 LTC John C. Harris, 2001–2005 (Kosovo)
 LTC Todd A. Mayer, 2005–2008
 LTC John A. Zulfer, 2008–2010
 LTC James D. Eriksen Jr., 2010–2012
 LTC Daniel J. Long, 2012-2014
 LTC Joshua B. Quantz, 2014-2017
 LTC Dion A. Grener, 2017–2020
 LTC Aaron A. Combs, 2020–2022
 LTC William R. Cousins IV, 2022-Present

Command Sergeants Major, 107th ACR
 CSM William S. Walker, 1968–1973
 CSM Philip A. Caranci, 1973–1984
 CSM Nate Monastra, 1984–1993

Command Sergeants Major, 1–107th Cavalry
 CSM Michael Campbell, 1993–1997 (Vietnam)
 CSM Timothy Johnson, 1997–2000 (Vietnam, Kosovo)
 CSM Albert M. Whatmough, 2000–2007 (Operation Iraqi Freedom)
 CSM Timothy Hornung, 2007 (Operation Iraqi Freedom)

Command Sergeants Major, 2–107th
 CSM Craig R. Huffman, 1994–1996
 CSM Donald E. Cain II, 1997–2000
 CSM Terry T. Dillon, 2000–2002 (Vietnam, Kosovo)
 CSM William F. Belding, 2003– (Kosovo, Operation Enduring Freedom Afghanistan)
 CSM David LaRussa
 CSM Todd R. Seurkamp
 CSM Robert D. Corner, DEC 2017- APRIL 2021
 CSM Gordon L. Cairns, APRIL 2021-present

References

External links
 Ohio National Guard homepage
 U.S. Army Institute of Heraldry page for 145th Armored Regiment, Ohio Army National Guard

107
Military units and formations in Ohio
Ohio Army National Guard
Ohio National Guard units
Military units and formations of the United States in the War on Terror
Military units and formations established in 1877
Military units and formations disestablished in 1993
1877 establishments in Ohio